Dawlat Berdi (died 1432), also known as Devlet Berdi, was a Khan of the Golden Horde who reigned from 1419 to 1421, and again from 1428 to his death in 1432. He was the son of Jabbar Berdi and a descendant of Berke Khan.

Life 
His first reign was brief, lasting from 1419 to 1421, when he and his rival Ulugh Muhammad were defeated by Baraq. After Baraq's assassination in 1427, Dawlat established himself in Crimea. Ulugh Muhammad attempted an invasion of his territory in 1430, but was unable to defeat Berdi and retreated following the death of Vytautas, his main supporter.

Due to the efforts of Hacı I Giray Dawlat was never able to consolidate control over Crimea and was assassinated in 1432. His son, Äxmät, proved unable to resist the combined forces of Ulugh Muhammad and the Crimean Tatars and was defeated the following year, leading to the creation of the Crimean Khanate.

An unnamed daughter may have become the wife of John IV of Trebizond.

Genealogy
Genghis Khan
Jochi
Orda Khan
Sartaqtay
Köchü
Bayan
Sasibuqa
Ilbasan
Chimtay
Tuli Kwadja
Tokhtamysh
Jabbar Berdi
Dawlat Berdi

See also
List of Khans of the Golden Horde
Siege of Sarai

References
Paine, Sheila: The Golden Horde: From the Himalaya to the Mediterranean, Penguin Books, 1998.

1432 deaths
Khans of the Golden Horde
Assassinated royalty
Medieval Crimea
15th-century monarchs in Europe
Year of birth unknown